KIMA may refer to:

 KIMA-TV, a television station (channel 29) licensed to Yakima, Washington, United States
 KIMA Wireless Technologies, a manufacturer of wireless audio transmitters
 Korea Studies in Media Arts, which hosts the annual Korean American Film Festival in San Francisco